The 1976 Canadian Grand Prix was a Formula One motor race held at Mosport Park on 3 October 1976.

At this weekend, British championship contender James Hunt found out that he lost 9 points from his victory at the British Grand Prix that year, and Austrian championship leader Niki Lauda gained another 3 points (he finished 2nd at that race). Hunt won the Mosport event, but it made no difference to his championship points standings before the race.

Qualifying
James Hunt managed to take pole position from the March cars of Ronnie Peterson and Vittorio Brambilla, whilst the rest of the top 10 qualifiers were Patrick Depailler, Mario Andretti, Niki Lauda, Jody Scheckter, Hans Joachim Stuck, Jacques Laffite and Carlos Pace in the leading Brabham.

Qualifying classification

Race
James Hunt started from pole position but as ever, he didn't get away well off the start and allowed Peterson and in the March to take first ahead of Hunt and teammate Brambilla for the early stages. That was until Hunt retook the lead on lap 10, whilst Peterson and Brambilla fell out of the points later on. As Depailler took second for Tyrrell and Andretti was third in the leading Lotus. The order of the top 3 didn't change whilst Hunt's rival Lauda who was running 5th for most of the race had also dropped out of the points with the Marches due to handling problems, he would eventually finished 8th as a result. James Hunt had won the race ahead of Patrick Depailler, Mario Andretti, Jody Scheckter, Jochen Mass and Clay Regazzoni. Which closed the gap from 17 back to 8 points in the championship, but Hunt was still slightly furious over his disqualification from the British Grand Prix after the race.

Classification

Championship standings after the race

Drivers' Championship standings

Constructors' Championship standings

Note: Only the top five positions are included for both sets of standings. Only the best 7 results from the first 8 races and the best 7 results from the last 8 races counted towards the Championship. Numbers without parentheses are Championship points; numbers in parentheses are total points scored.

References

Canadian Grand Prix
Canadian Grand Prix
1976 in Canadian motorsport
Grand Prix